Tomasz Bednarek and Mateusz Kowalczyk were the defending champions, but chose to not compete this year.Guillermo Olaso and Pere Riba won the final against Pablo Andújar and Gerard Granollers-Pujol 7–6(1), 4–6, [10–5].

Seeds

Draw

Draw

External links
 Doubles Draw

Doubles
2010 ATP Challenger Tour